EnForma Santa Cruz are a Bolivian women's football club based in Santa Cruz de la Sierra. They won the Bolivian League five times. EnForma Santa Cruz were representing Bolivia in the 2009 Copa Libertadores de Fútbol Femenino. In that competition EnForma lost 4 matches and drew one game.

Achievements
 Bolivian women's football championship:
 Winners (5): 2005, 2006, 2007, 2008, 2009

References

Women's football clubs in Bolivia